The Saudi Basketball League (SBL) is a professional basketball league in Saudi Arabia. It was established in 1976.

Current clubs

Past champions

References

External links
Saudi Arabia basketball at Asia-Basket.com
Official Saudi Basketball Federation website 
Saudi Premier League at goalzz.com
Past league champions at goalzz.com

League
Basketball leagues in Asia
Sports leagues established in 1977
1977 establishments in Saudi Arabia
basketball